Marco Carola (born 7 February 1975, Naples, Italy) is an Italian electronic musician and DJ.

Life 
As a producer and label head, Carola has created labels like Design, Zenit, Question, One Thousands, Do.Mi.No. and Music On. Carola has been releasing music on a selection of labels such as Minus, Plus 8, 2M, and Primate Recordings. In addition to five albums, including his latest, Play It Loud, in 2011, Carola has also been responsible for a clutch of seminal mix compilations. In 2006, his mix Fabric 31 for the London club Fabric's series was a lesson in sleek, future-facing minimalism. That was followed up by compilations for Time Warp in 2009.
Carola has also held very successful residencies at Amnesia Ibiza, with Cocoon, for two years, and with his own Music On project from 2012 until 2018. Music On was launched in 2011 at the Shelbourne Hotel in Miami, as the way for Carola to implement his vision of clubbing and music development and to share his wealth of experience and knowledge. Luca Piccolo was also established as Carola's manager and international booker the same year.

At Sunwaves 17 in 2015 in Mamaia, Romania, Marco Carola played music for 24 hours, non-stop.

Marco bought his first set of turntables at age 15.

Selected discography

DJ mix compilations 
 Marco Carola: Fabric 31, 2006
 Time Warp Compilation 09, Time Warp, 2009
 Marco Carola And Nick Curly - Party Animals, Cocoon Recordings, 2010
 RA.252 (File, MP3, Mixed, 160), Resident Advisor, 2011
 Marco Carola - Music On Closing, 28/09/12 Live at Amnesia Ibiza, Music On 2012 
 Marco Carola - Music On the Mix - IBIZA 2013, Music On 2013 
 Marco Carola - Essential Music Ibiza 2014, Music On 2014 
 Marco Carola - Live at BPM Festival - January 10, 2016, Music On 2016 
 Marco Carola - Live at Sound Nightclub - Los Angeles, February 24, 2017, Music On 2017 
 Marco Carola - Music On After Hour at Martina Beach - Playa del Carmen, Mexico. The BPM Festival, Music On 2018

Albums 
 Marco Carola: "The 1000 Collection", One Thousands, 1998
 Marco Carola: "Fokus", Zenit, 1998		
 Marco Carola: "Open System", Zenit, 2001	
 Marco Carola: "Question 10", Question, 2002	
 Marco Carola: "Play It Loud!", Minus, 2011

Singles & EPs 
 Hard Melody, Subway Records, 1995
 Apollo 13, Subway Records, 1995
 Marco Carola DJ Present C.O.M.A. - Global Trip Vol. 1, XXX Records, 1996
 Design, Design Music, 1996
 Marco Carola DJ* Present C.O.M.A. - Global Trip Vol. 3, XXX Records, 1996
 Marco Carola DJ* Present C.O.M.A. - Global Trip Vol. 2, XXX Records, 1996
 Follow Me, Subway Records, 1996
 Nuclear E.P. - Creation, One Thousands, 1996
 Carola E.P. - Essence, One Thousands, 1996
 Man Train EP, i220, 1997
 Tracks For Monostress Blue, Monostress Blue, 1997
 Hypertension E.P., Primate Recordings, 1997
 Collectors Edition, One Thousands, 1997
 Pure Activity, One Thousands, 1997
 Synthetic, One Thousands, 1997
 Cosmic, One Thousands, 1997
 Mania, One Thousands, 1997
 The End, One Thousands, 1997
 Interplay, One Thousands, 1997
 Dope, One Thousands, 1997
 The Brainblister E.P., Nitric, 1997
 Eternity, Design Music, 1997
 Ante Zenit 05, Zenit, 1998
 Ante Zenit 2, Zenit, 1998
 Ante Zenit 1, Zenit, 1998
 Fragile EP, Zenit, 1999
 Marco Carola & Gaetano Parisio - Coincidence, Conform, Conform, 1999
 Sasse & Marco Carola - Be With You, Not On Label, 2000
 Ante Open System EP, Zenit, 2001
 Appendix C, Southsoul Appendix, 2002
 Marco Carola & Cisco Ferreira - Night Clan EP, Zenit, 2003
 Avalanche (Kevin Saunderson Remixes), Zenit, 2003
 Diapason EP, Zenit, 2003
 Domino 02, Domestic Minimal Noise, 2004
 do.mi.no 01, Domestic Minimal Noise, 2004
 Avalanche, Zenit, 2004
 Domino 03, Domestic Minimal Noise, 2005
 Do.mi.no 04, Domestic Minimal Noise, 2005
 1000 Remix, ELP Medien & Verlags GmbH, 2005
 Apnea, Plus 8 Records Ltd., 2007
 Re_Solution, Minus 2M, 2007
 Plus Two, Plus 8 Records Ltd., 2008
 Bloody Cash, Plus 8 Records Ltd., 2008
 Get Set, 2M, 2008
 Plus One, Plus 8 Records Ltd., 2008
 Walking Dog, Minus, 2009
 Frankie Goes to Hollywood - Relax (Marco Carola Edit), Music On 2013

External links 
 
 Marco Carola's Music On label site
 Marco Carola's discography at Discogs

References

1975 births
Living people
Italian DJs
Musicians from Naples
Ableton Live users
Electronic dance music DJs